The New Caledonian leopard skink (Lacertoides pardalis) is a species of skink monotypic in the genus Lacertoides. It is endemic to New Caledonia.

References

Skinks of New Caledonia
Lizard genera
Reptiles described in 1997
Taxa named by Ross Allen Sadlier
Taxa named by Glenn Michael Shea
Taxa named by Aaron M. Bauer